The Arizona Outlaws were a team of American Indoor Football that played during 2012 only.  Based in Prescott Valley, Arizona, the Outlaws played their home games at Tim's Toyota Center.

The Outlaws were the second indoor football team to play in Prescott Valley, following the Arizona Adrenaline which played in the American Indoor Football Association for 2008 before taking two seasons off, after which they reactivated as a member of the Indoor Football League for the 2011 season before folding for good after said season. The team's name was picked from a suggestion box and shares its name with the Arizona Outlaws of the United States Football League.

Season-by-season

|-
|2012 || 1 || 4 || — || 3rd of 4, Western8th of 11, AIF || Did not qualify
|-

References

External links
 Arizona Outlaws official website
 American Indoor Football official Website

 
2011 establishments in Arizona
2012 disestablishments in Arizona
American football teams in Arizona
Sports in Prescott Valley, Arizona